A gubernatorial election was held on 18 November 1990 to elect the Governor of ,  who is the southernmost and westernmost prefecture of Japan.

Candidates 

Junji Nishime, 69, incumbent since 1978, former Representative of the LDP, also backed by the DSP.
Masahide Ōta, 65, endorsed by the union of the left (Progress and Unity), including the OSMP, JSP, JCP and Komeito.

Results

References 

1990 elections in Japan
Okinawa gubernatorial elections